Radha Brahmbhatt won the Miss India Britain 2008 beauty pageant title. She participated in the Femina Miss India pageant in 2008 and later represented India in the Miss International 2008 contest.

See also
 Parvathy Omanakuttan
 Simran Kaur Mundi

References

Living people
Indian beauty pageant winners
Year of birth missing (living people)
Place of birth missing (living people)